Andriy Bohdanovych Zin (born 14 July 2000) is a Ukrainian professional footballer who plays as a centre-back for Ukrainian club Nyva Ternopil.

References

External links
 

2000 births
Living people
Sportspeople from Ternopil
Ukrainian footballers
Association football defenders
FC Volyn Lutsk players
FC Kovel-Volyn Kovel players
FC Nyva Ternopil players
Ukrainian First League players